Bağlarbaşı is a village in the Gölbaşı District, Adıyaman Province, Turkey. Its population is 100 (2021).

The hamlet of Uğurlu is attached to the village.

Notable people
 
 
Father Samuel (born 1942), Syriac Orthodox monk-priest

References

Villages in Gölbaşı District, Adıyaman Province